Khallet Michte is a Heavy Neolithic archaeological site of the Qaraoun culture located in the Caza of Bint Jbeil in the Nabatiye Governorate in Lebanon. The two sites Khallet Michte I and Khallet Michte II are located in adjacent wadis on south facing slopes between a track and the main road between Bint Jbeil and  Ain Ebel. They were found by Henri Fleisch and noted to contain both Heavy Neolithic and Acheulean flint tools which are now in the collection of the Museum of Lebanese Prehistory at the Saint Joseph University.

References

Heavy Neolithic sites
Neolithic settlements
Archaeological sites in Lebanon